is a velodrome located in Misato, Akita. Rokugo's oval is 333 meters in circumference.

References

Velodromes in Japan
Cycle racing in Japan
Sports venues in Akita Prefecture
Sports venues completed in 2004
2004 establishments in Japan
Misato, Akita